Breese Township is one of fifteen townships in Clinton County, Illinois, USA. As of the 2010 census, its population was 5,417 and it contained 2,243 housing units.

Geography

Cities, towns, villages
 Aviston (east edge)
 Breese

Unincorporated towns
 Snearlyville

Cemeteries
 Lake Branch
 Saint Dominic
 Saint John

Major highways
  US Route 50

Airports and landing strips
 Dennis Meier Heliport
 Saint Josephs Hospital Heliport

Demographics

Political districts
 Illinois's 19th congressional district
 State House District 107
 State Senate District 54

References
 
 US Census Bureau 2007 TIGER/Line Shapefiles
 US National Atlas

External links
 City-Data.com
 Illinois State Archives

Townships in Clinton County, Illinois
Townships in Illinois